HX, Hx, Hx, or hx may refer to:

Businesses and brands
 Dolby HX and Dolby HX Pro, headroom extensions for analog recording
 Hummer HX, a concept automobile
 RMMV HX range of tactical trucks, military trucks 
 Hong Kong Airlines (IATA code)

Other uses
 Ĥ, a character in the Esperanto language
 .hx, the file extension for the Haxe programming language
 HX (convoy), a convoy code used during World War II
 Hx or Hx, medical history
 HX postcode area, England, covering the Halifax area
 Short name for Harolds Cross, a suburb of Dublin, Ireland.
 Hydrogen halide, a chemical compound
 Informal engineering shorthand for heat exchanger
 Human experience, see Customer experience (CX), User experience (UX).

See also
 Hex (disambiguation)

Film
 HX, a 2002 British film; co-production with Pathé
 HXII, a 2005 British film; co-production with Pathé and Fuzzy Door Productions